The statue of Saint Wenceslas is an outdoor sculpture by Čeněk Vosmík, installed at Hradčany Square near Prague Castle in Prague, Czech Republic.

External links

 

Hradčany
Monuments and memorials in Prague
Outdoor sculptures in Prague
Sculptures of men in Prague
Statues in Prague
Wenceslas